P. laeta may refer to:

 Paramarpissa laeta, a jumping spider
 Pavetta laeta, a plant with white flowers
 Periploca laeta, a North American moth
 Pholis laeta, an elongated fish
 Physocephala laeta, a thick-headed fly
 Potentilla laeta, a perennial plant
 Pselliophora laeta, a crane fly
 Pseudorinympha laeta, an ermine moth
 Ptosima laeta, a jewel beetle
 Pyrrhospora laeta, a lichenized fungus
 Pyrrhulina laeta, a South American fish